Yayuk Basuki was the defending champion, but lost in the second round to tournament winner Linda Wild.

Wild won the tournament by defeating Wang Shi-ting 7–5, 6–2 in the final.

Seeds

Draw

Finals

Top half

Bottom half

References

External links
 Official results archive (ITF)
 Official results archive (WTA)

1995 WTA Tour